Florence Giolitti (born 31 August 1966 at Nice) is a former French athlete, who specialized in the Middle-distance running. She held the 800m record in 1986.

Biography  
Giolitti won three French National 800m titles: two outdoors in 1984 and 1991, and one indoors in 1992.

On 15 July 1986, in Nice, she established a new French 800 meters running 1:59.32. She also improved three times the French 1500 meters, bringing it to 4:05.78 in 1987 in Zurich.

She still holds the France junior record for 800 m and for 1,500m, and France U-23 records for 800 m,  1,000 m and 1,500 m.

Prize list

National 
 French Championships in Athletics   :  
 winner of the 800m 1984 and 1991   
 winner of the 800 meters indoors in 1992

Records

Notes and references  

1966 births
Living people
French female middle-distance runners
20th-century French women